The following are the El Salvador national football team statistical records.

Player records

Players in bold are still active with El Salvador.

Competition records

FIFA World Cup

El Salvador has never advanced beyond the first round of the finals competition. El Salvador declined to participate at the 1950 FIFA World Cup.

CONCACAF Gold Cup

CONCACAF Nations League

Copa Centroamericana

CCCF Championship

Olympic Games

Pan American Games

Central American and Caribbean Games

Central American Games

Head-to-head record
The list shown below shows the El Salvador national football team all-time international record against opposing nations. The stats are composed of FIFA World Cup and qualifiers, the CONCACAF Gold Cup, as well as numerous other international friendly tournaments and matches.

Updated to 16 November 2022 after the match against .

FIFA ranking record
The following is a chart of the yearly averages of El Salvador's FIFA ranking.

Notes

References

External links
 FIFA.com
 Worldfootball.net

El Salvador national football team
National association football team records and statistics